Heinz Schildan is a German ice hockey player, who competed for SG Dynamo Weißwasser. He won the bronze medal with the East Germany national ice hockey team at the 1966 European Championships.

Schildan played a total of 22 games for East Germany at the World Championships between 1961 and 1966, recording one assist.

References

Living people
German ice hockey players
Year of birth missing (living people)